Loreauville High School is a public high school located in Loreauville, Louisiana, United States, at 410 North Main Street. It is a part of Iberia Parish Public Schools.

Administration
Principal - Karen J. Bashay

Athletics
The Loreauville High athletic department competes in the Louisiana High School Athletic Association in Class 2A.

Championships
Baseball Championships
The baseball team won the 2018 LHSAA 2A State Championship.

Notable alumni
 Lionel Vital, NFL player and executive

References

External links
Loreauville High School website

Educational institutions in the United States with year of establishment missing
Public high schools in Louisiana
Schools in Iberia Parish, Louisiana